The Best FIFA Football Awards 2016 were held on 9 January 2017 in Zürich, Switzerland. The Best FIFA Football Awards are the annual recognitions awarded by FIFA to several individuals across different categories, including: best eleven players of the year, known as FIFA FIFPro World XI (awards goalkeeper, best defenders l, midfielders, attackers), FIFA World Coach of the Year for men's and for women's football, best female player of the year, 2nd best male player of the year, and best goal of the year (known as FIFA Puskás Award). The FIFA Fair Play Award is the only award that usually goes to groups or entities instead of individuals. 

The selection criteria for the (men's and women's) players of the year were: sporting performance, as well as general conduct on and off the pitch from 20 November 2015 to 22 November 2016. The selection criteria for the coaches of the year were: performance and general behaviour of their teams on and off the pitch from 20 November 2015 to 22 November 2016.

The votes were decided by media representatives, national team coaches, and national team captains. In October 2016, it was announced that the general public would also be allowed to vote. Each group contributed 25% of the overall vote.

The ceremony was hosted by Eva Longoria and Marco Schreyl.

Winners and nominees

The Best FIFA Men's Player

The Football Committee compiled a shortlist of 23 male players for The Best FIFA Men's Player.

The 23 candidates were announced on 4 November. The three finalists were announced on 1 December 2016.

Cristiano Ronaldo won the award with nearly 35% of the vote.

The Best FIFA Women's Player

The Committee for Women's Football and the FIFA Women's World Cup compiled a shortlist of 10 female players for The Best FIFA Women's Player.

The 10 candidates were announced on 3 November. The three finalists were announced on 2 December.

Carli Lloyd won the award with nearly 21% of the vote.

The Best FIFA Men's Coach

The Football Committee compiled a shortlist of 10 men's football coaches for The Best FIFA Men's Coach.

The 10 candidates were announced on 2 November. The three finalists were announced in December 2016.

Claudio Ranieri won the award with over 22% of the vote.

The Best FIFA Women's Coach

The Committee for Women's Football and the FIFA Women's World Cup compiled a shortlist of 10 women's football coaches for The Best FIFA Women's Coach.

The 10 candidates were announced on 1 November. The three finalists were announced on 2 December 2016.

Silvia Neid won the award with nearly 30% of the vote.

FIFA Fair Play Award

Colombian club Atlético Nacional won the award due to their gesture of asking CONMEBOL to award the 2016 Copa Sudamericana title to Brazilian club Chapecoense following the LaMia Flight 2933 disaster, which resulted in the deaths of 19 players and 23 staff members of the Brazilian club.

FIFA Award for an Outstanding Career
Brazilian futsal player Falcão won the award for his 27 years of contribution to the sport.

FIFA Puskás Award

The shortlist was announced on 21 November 2016. The three finalists were announced on 2 December 2016.

Mohd Faiz Subri won the award with over 59% of the vote.

FIFA Fan Award
The three nominees were announced on 9 December 2016. It was the first time that this award was given.

Borussia Dortmund and Liverpool supporters won the award with nearly 46% of the vote.

FIFA FIFPro World11

The 55–player men's shortlist was announced on 1 December 2016.

The players chosen included Manuel Neuer as goalkeeper, Dani Alves, Gerard Piqué, Sergio Ramos, and Marcelo as defenders, Luka Modrić, Toni Kroos, and Andrés Iniesta as midfielders, and Lionel Messi, Luis Suárez, and Cristiano Ronaldo as forwards.

9 out of the 11 players played in La Liga.

Second Team

Third Team

Fourth Team

Fifth Team

See also
 Ballon d'Or
 FIFA Ballon d'Or
 FIFA World Player of the Year
 FIFPro World XI

References

External links
 Official Facebook website

2016
2016 in association football
2016 sports awards
January 2017 sports events in Europe
2017 in Swiss sport
Sport in Zürich
21st century in Zürich
Women's association football trophies and awards
2016 in women's association football